Ahmet Kireççi (aka Ahmet Mersinli, 27 October 1914 in Mersin – 17 August 1978 in Mersin, Turkey), was a Turkish sports wrestler, who won the Olympic medal twice, the bronze medal in the Middleweight class of Men's Freestyle Wrestling at the 1936 Olympics and the gold medal in the Heavyweight class of Men's Greco-Roman category at the 1948 Olympics.

Born in the southern city of Mersin, he began first boxing and then continued in athletics. He switched over to wrestling and took part in a yağlı güreş (oil wrestling) competition in Tarsus, where he became champion.

Ahmet Kireççi was sent to Istanbul to join the Wrestling Club of Kumkapı. In 1931, he was admitted to the national team, of which he was a member 17 years long. At 18 years of age, he became Balkan champion, a title he repeated twice more. With his bronze medal gathered at the 1936 Summer Olympic Games, he was the debut Turkish freestyle wrestler medallist and be an Olympic medallist in both wrestling styles.

Following President İsmet İnönü's suggestion at a reception after his return, Ahmet Kireççi accepted to change his family name officially to Mersinli, which was his nickname.

He died on 17 August 1978, following a traffic accident in his hometown. A statue of him erected in a corner near the harbour of Mersin commemorates the successful and popular wrestler.

Achievements
 1932 Balkan Championships - gold
 1936 Olympics in Berlin, Germany - bronze (Freestyle Middleweight)
 1937 World Championships - bronze
 1940 Balkan Championships - gold
 1948 Olympics in London, England - gold (Greco-Roman Heavyweight)

Notes

References
Olympics Database
Newspaper Sabah 13 August 2004 
Yumuktepe

External links
 

1914 births
1979 deaths
Sportspeople from Mersin
Olympic wrestlers of Turkey
Wrestlers at the 1936 Summer Olympics
Wrestlers at the 1948 Summer Olympics
Turkish male sport wrestlers
Olympic gold medalists for Turkey
Olympic bronze medalists for Turkey
Road incident deaths in Turkey
Olympic medalists in wrestling
Burials at Mersin Cemetery
Medalists at the 1948 Summer Olympics
Medalists at the 1936 Summer Olympics
20th-century Turkish people